Theudebald (also Theodebald, Theodobald, Theudowald, Theutbald or Teutbold) is a Germanic masculine given name from the early Middle Ages. It may refer to:
Theudebald, king of the Franks (547–55)
Theudebald, Duke of Alamannia (floruit 709–45)
Theutbald I (bishop of Langres) (floruit 841–56)
Theutbald II (bishop of Langres) (floruit 888–94)

See also
Theobald (disambiguation)